Marya Yakovlevna Stroganova (1678–1734), was a Russian courtier.

She was married to the courtier Grigory Dmitriyevich Stroganov. She was the godchild of Peter the Great and belonged to his circle of favorites. She sometimes took part in his drinking parties.

She was a lady-in-waiting to Catherine I of Russia and then Anna of Russia from 1724 and was a well known figure at court.

References 

1678 births
1734 deaths
Ladies-in-waiting from the Russian Empire